The Seasoning House is a 2013 British horror film directed by Paul Hyett. It was his directorial debut and stars Rosie Day, Kevin Howarth and Sean Pertwee.

Synopsis
Angel is a young girl who is forced to work in a house that specializes in supplying kidnapped women forced into the sex trade to various military personnel. Initially planned to be put to work as an unwilling sex slave, Angel, a Deaf with an "unattractive" birth mark on her face, instead becomes the assistant to Viktor, who runs the brothel. During the day she is given the duty of putting makeup on the kidnapped women and drugging them. After they have been violently raped by various men, Angel has the duty of cleaning them up.

At night Angel wanders the walls and crawlspaces of the house, which is when she befriends newcomer Vanya who understands sign language. The squad that brought in Angel comes for a visit. The commander, Goran, brings his squad into the brothel, including his beloved brother, Josif, and another soldier, Ivan. Angel crawls through the vents from her room to Vanya's room and sees Vanya being raped by Ivan. When Ivan kills Vanya, Angel uses a knife to attack and kill him. The shuffling noises inside the room alert Goran, Viktor, and the rest of the squad who come to find Ivan and Vanya dead, with Angel gone. The rest of the men start looking for Angel. Goran sends one of his men into the vents, but Angel is able to outmaneuver and kill him. Viktor kills one of Goran's men because he has been losing so many women from the brutal rapes.

Angel escapes the house and runs into a nearby forest. As Goran, Josif and Viktor start looking for her, Angel sees all the dead women decomposing in the forest. Viktor catches up to Angel and convinces her that he isn't going to harm her, and she gives up the knife. Viktor, being caught by Goran and Josif, offers Angel in exchange for their mercy. The three men are at a standstill with their weapons drawn with Viktor using Angel as a human shield.  Viktor convinces Goran and Josif to call a truce by offering half of his profits.  As the men slowly put down their weapons, Angel grabs the knife from Viktor's belt and stabs him in the foot causing him to inadvertently shoot Josif.  Goran is enraged and shoots Viktor.  Josif then dies and Goran kills Viktor by shooting him several times.

Angel escapes to a woman's house, but soon realizes the woman is Ivan's wife, Lexi. After Lexi gets a call from Goran and hears the tragic news of Josif, she unsuccessfully attempts to kill Angel. Angel kills her and starts running to the nearest factory. Goran catches up and they start climbing the tubes. When Goran gets stuck, Angel stuffs his mouth with a rag so he would be unable to speak or call for help. Angel proceeds out of the tube leaving Goran behind to suffocate.  Finally free, Angel runs to the nearest house and is helped by an elderly couple. It is the doctor's house which Viktor calls for help regarding his girls.

Cast
Rosie Day as Angel
Kevin Howarth as Viktor
Sean Pertwee as Goran
 Anna Walton as Violeta
 Jemma Powell as Alexa
 David Lemberg as Dimitri
 Amanda Wass as Arijana
 Sean Cronin as Branimar
 Tomi May as Aleksander
 Emma Britton as Samira
 Emily Tucker as Nina
 Katy Allen as Tatjana
 Thomas Worthington as Vinko
 Gina Abolins as Jasmina
 Dominique Provost-Chalkley as Vanya
 Fabiano De Souza Ramos as Dragan
 Christopher Rithin as Danijel
 Rachel Waring as Emilia
 Laurence Saunders as Stevan
 Tommie Grabiec as Ratko
 Philip Anthony as Dr. Andre
 Alec Utgoff as Josif
 Ryan Oliva as Ivan
 Daniel Vivian as Radovan
 James Bartlett as Marko
 Adrian Bouchet as Branko
 Eddie Oswald as Boiler Room Thug
 Abigail Hamilton as Marisa

Production
Filming for the movie began in January 2012 at a disused air force base in London. Stuart Bailey and Paul Blackwell appear in uncredited cameos.

Reception
The film received negative reviews. It holds a 21% rating on Rotten Tomatoes, based on reviews from 14 critics.
Empire  called it, "Strikingly bold and brutally compelling. It also handles its delicate subject more carefully than you might imagine from a brief synopsis".  Starburst Magazine said: "The film is just powerful and gut-churning enough to leave a lasting impression and one of the strongest directorial debuts of recent times. Boasting a remarkable performance from young Rosie Day, the film is very different from your typical British genre picture and is a refreshing change from endless zombie films or movies about hooded violent teenagers". Dreadcentral said "Hyett’s direction is measured, confident, and darkly poetic throughout, weaving an emotional web of tenderness amidst hopelessness and abuse. The Seasoning House is a lyrical, bleak, and deeply wounding exploration of brutality and inhumanity that cries out to be seen". Bloody Disgusting wrote that "What makes The Seasoning House stand out is that everything about it is simple and done in a way that just results in the proper definition of art".

Time Out London criticized what they saw as a "failure to blend the raw sexual violence and social comment with more familiar generic tropes" and the "downbeat switchback ending" that they felt was "neither convincing nor earned.". The Guardian also panned the film, as they felt that the depictions of human monsters were "cardboard" and did not feel genuine.

Awards
The Critics award at Fantasporto, Portugal.
The Critics Award at Mile High Horror Festival at Denver, Colorado.
Best Actress at Screamfest LA – Rosie Day.
Best actress Rosie Day at Fantaspoa, Brazil.
Best Film, Best Director and Best Actress at Bragacine IFF, Portugal.

References

External links
 

2012 films
2012 horror thriller films
Bosnian War films
British horror thriller films
Films about kidnapping
Films about prostitution in the United Kingdom
Murder in films
Sterling Pictures films
2012 directorial debut films
Films about the Serbian Mafia
2010s English-language films
2010s British films